The Brazilian Army is the land arm of the Brazilian Armed Forces. The Brazilian Army has fought in several international conflicts, mostly in South America during the 19th century. In the 20th century, it fought on the Allied side in World War I and World War II. Aligned with the Western Bloc during the military dictatorship in Brazil from 1964 to 1985, it also had active participation in Latin America and Southern Portuguese Africa during the Cold War, as well as taking part in UN peacekeeping missions worldwide since the late 1950s.

Domestically, besides having faced several rebellions throughout the two centuries since its creation, it also ended the monarchy with support of local political and economic elites and imposed its political views and economic development projects during the periods when it ruled the country: 1889–94, 1930–50 (First Vargas period and Dutra years), and 1964–85.

History

Origins (16th to 18th centuries) 
Although the Brazilian Army was only created during the Brazilian independence process from Portugal in 1822, with units of the Portuguese Army in Brazil that had remained loyal to prince Pedro, its origins date back to the Land Forces used by the Portuguese in the colonial wars against the French and Dutch, fought in the 16th and 17th centuries.

In the colonial period, Portuguese king Manuel I ordered military expeditions with the goal of protecting the Portuguese dominions in South America, then newly discovered. As colonization advanced in Pernambuco and São Vicente, the native military authorities and bases of the colony's defensive organization began to be built to defend it against the French, English, and the Dutch.

The first major interventions were the expulsion of the French from Rio de Janeiro in the 16th century and the Maranhão in 1615. As colonization progressed through the broad territorial expansion movement in the 17th and early 18th centuries, it forced the organization of the defense of the newly conquered territory.

In the 17th century, the war against the Dutch mobilized large numbers of soldiers in the country for the first time and gave rise to a sense of national defense regardless of the influence of the crown. The first Battle of Guararapes (1648) marks the beginning of the organization of the army as a genuine Brazilian force formed by local whites, led by André Vidal de Negreiros; amerindians, led by Felipe Camarão; and blacks, led by Henrique Dias. This date is celebrated today as the anniversary of the Brazilian Army.

At that time, following the organization model of the mainland Portuguese Army, implemented during the Portuguese Restoration War starting in 1640, the ground forces in Brazil adopted three lines of organization which were maintained until the 19th century, which included:

 1st line - Paid troops;
 2nd line - Auxiliary troops (called "milícias" from the end of the 18th century);
 3rd line - Ordenanças

19th century

During the Independence process, the Imperial Brazilian Army was initially composed of Brazilians, Portuguese, and foreign mercenaries. Trained in guerrilla warfare, most of its commanders were mercenaries and Portuguese officers loyal to Pedro I. In 1822 and 1823, the Imperial Army was able to defeat the Portuguese resistance, especially in the north of the country and in Cisplatina, also preventing the fragmentation of the newly proclaimed Brazilian Empire after its independence war.

After the Independence War the Army, supported by the National Guard, destroyed separatist movements in the early years after independence, enforcing the central authority of the empire during the regency period. It repressed a host of popular movements for political autonomy or against slavery and the large landowners' power across Brazil.

The National Guard was a military force organized during the regency period in August 1831 and demobilized in September 1922. Its creation occurred by means of law of 18 August 1831 that "creates the National Guard and extinguishes the bodies of militias, city guards and ordinances." According to the aforementioned law, in its article 1, "the National Guards are created to defend the Constitution, liberty, independence, and the integrity of the Empire, to maintain obedience and public tranquility, and to assist the Line Army in defense of borders and coasts", based on article 145 of the 1824 Constitution: "All Brazilians are obliged to take up arms to support the independence and integrity of the Empire, and defend it from its external or internal enemies." In September 1850, through Law No. 602, the National Guard was reorganized and retained its powers subordinated to the Minister of Justice and the provincial presidents.

During the 1850s and early 1860s, the Army, along with the Navy, entered in action against Argentine and Uruguayan forces, which were opposed to the Brazilian empire's interests. The Brazilian success with such "Gun Diplomacy" eventually led to a shock of interests with another country with similar aspirations, Paraguay, in December 1864.

On 1 May 1865, Brazil, Uruguay, and Argentina signed the Treary of the Triple Alliance to defend themselves against aggression from Paraguay, which was ruled by Francisco López. López's troops were heading for the south of Brazil and the north of Uruguay after invading Brazilian territory through the Mato Grosso province and the north of Argentina. Many slaves had been incorporated into the Brazilian forces to face the increasingly serious situation. As a result of their solid performance during the conflict, the Armed Forces developed a strong sense against slavery. After five years of warfare (the largest in South American history), the Alliance led by Brazil defeated López.

During this war, the Imperial Brazilian Army mobilized 200,000 men, divided into the following categories: 18,000 Army personnel who were in Uruguay in 1864; 2,047 in the province of Mato Grosso; 56,000 Fatherland Volunteers; 62,000 National Guardsmen; 11,900 freed slaves; and an additional 22,000 National Guardsmen who remained in Brazil to defend their homeland.

In November 1889, after a long attrition with the monarchical regime deepened by the abolition of slavery, the army led a coup d'état that resulted in the end of the empire and the founding of a republic. The implementation of the first Brazilian military dictatorship (that ended in 1894), was followed by a severe economic crisis that deepened into an institutional one with Congress and the Navy, which degenerated into a civil war in the southern region.

20th century

Between 1893 and 1927, during the First Brazilian Republic, the Army had to deal with various movements: some were derived from Navy and Army corps who were unsatisfied with the regime and demanded for democratic changes, while others had popular origins without conventional political intentions guided by messianic leaders, like in Canudos and the Contestado Wars.

The Canudos War, which took place in the northeastern sertão and covered several cities and many sertanejos in Bahia led by Antônio Conselheiro, the Contestado War that developed by dispute of territories of currency of the states of Paraná and Santa Catarina, led by José Maria.

These revolts were serious threats to the stability of the new republican regime and were related to the dissatisfaction of the population of the more distant northeastern sertão and regions of recent colonization like Paraná and western Santa Catarina with the Republic, since this population was predominantly Catholic and did not accept a Republic that appeared totally dominated by Masonic ideals like the separation of Church and the State.

After years of fighting and many deaths on both sides, these movements were defeated and the Republic consolidated.

During World War I, the Brazilian government sent three small military groups to Europe soon after declaring war on the Central Powers in October 1917. The first two units were from the army; one consisted of a medical staff and the other of a sergeants-officers group, and both were attached to the French Army in the Western Front in 1918.

From October 1930 to 1945, the army and elites linked to it took control over the country, having the landowner and opposition political leader, Getúlio Vargas, ahead of the movement. In this period, the Army defeated the Constitutionalist Revolt in 1932 and two separate coup d'état attempts: by Communists in November 1935 and by Fascists in May 1938. The Army also helped to formalize the dictatorship in 1937.

In August 1942, after German and Italian submarines sank Brazilian merchant ships, popular mobilization forced the Brazilian government to declare war on Fascist Italy and Nazi Germany. In July 1944, after almost two years of public pressure and negotiations with US authorities, an expeditionary force was sent to join the Allied forces in the Italian campaign. The army's contribution was composed of a full Infantry Division (about 25,000 men, replacements included), commanded by Major-General (later Marshal) João Baptista Mascarenhas de Morais, which in Italy was attached to the US IV Corps at the US Fifth Army, into the 15th Allied Army Group.

With the defeat of totalitarian regimes in World War II, Vargas was removed by the head of the army, General Dutra, who in 1946 won the Election dispute against Air Marshall, Eduardo Gomes. After the Vargas suicide (who succeeded Dutra in 1950) due to an institutional crisis, army sectors led by Marshal Lott ensured the inauguration of Juscelino Kubitschek's term, elected in 1955.

Between 1957 and 1967, the Brazilian Army created the Suez Battalion to be part of the UN Peace Forces in the conflict between the State of Israel, Egypt, and its Arab neighbors from 1956 onwards. The first contingent of the battalion, called the Detachment Precursor, made up of about 80 paratroopers, specialists in demining and the bulk of the battalion was transported to Suez aboard the Brazilian Navy ship Custódio de Melo, landed in Port Said on February 4, 1957. About 6,000 Brazilian Army men participated, in relay, in the Suez Battalion during its ten-year presence in Sinai Peninsula. The definitive return of the forces to Brazil took place on June 13, 1967, after the Six Day War. Seven Brazilian soldiers died during the years of Brazilian military presence there.

Military dictatorship 

With the resignation of Jânio Quadros who succeeded Kubitschek, a new institutional crisis opened up, exacerbated by the Cold War context, and in late March-early April 1964, the Brazilian Army (then led by General Humberto de Alencar Castelo Branco) seized power in the 1964 Brazilian coup d'état—its third—establishing dictatorship that lasted 21 years. The military regime was politically aligned with the interests of the United States government, and its rule was rife with human rights abuses.The coup of 1964 was the first of a series of coups d'état in South America that replaced democratically elected governments with military regimes. These dictatorships dominated South America until the 1980s. In this period, the Brazilian Army employed harsh means to suppress militant dissident groups: changing the law, restricting political rights, harassing and pursuing dissidents; and militarily, with support of police forces and militias, proceeding with methods of counter-guerrilla and counter-insurgency warfare to defeat the guerrilla movements that tried to combat the regime by force. The urban guerrillas were active in Brazil between 1968 and 1971, while in the rural areas the two main movements were subdued by the Army, one in the region where today are the Caparaó National Park (1967) and the other one in the region of Araguaya River (1972–74).

Internationally, in 1965 the Brazilian Army joined forces with US Marines intervening in the Dominican Republic in Operation Powerpack. During the 1970s, strengthened interchange and cooperative ties with armies from other South American countries giving and receiving advisement about counter-guerrilla and counter-insurgency methods, as for example in the Operation Condor, a procedural coordination to find, capture and eliminate political dissidents in mainland. From Geisel period, the third Brazilian dictatorship sought greater independence in its foreign policy, leaving of automatically align with the US interests, especially in relation to sub-Saharan Africa and Middle East.

In the mid-1970s, despite the dissent annulled (by elimination, detention or exile), the leftist guerrillas defeated and the legal opposition tamed, repression was not reduced. This added to the vices and the wear and tear of years of dictatorial power, plus the effects of the then oil/energy crisis and the Latin American default, during the late 1970s and early 1980s, led to increasing social pressures for democracy, which slowly but steadily forced the army to return to its professional activities.

21st century

Since the late 1950s, it has taken part in some United Nations peacekeeping missions as for example: in Suez 1956–67, East Timor 1999–2004, Angola 1995–1997 and Haiti since 2004, being the latest, the most recent outside intervention in that nation, as well as the longest length operation in the history of Brazilian military outside the country.

In the destructive earthquake that occurred in Haiti on January 12, 2010, eighteen Brazilian soldiers died. The Brazilian Army deployed about 2,150 troops to Haiti to help in the country's reconstruction.

The Brazilian Army is trying to renew its equipment and making a redistribution of its barracks in all the Brazilian Regions, prioritizing the Amazon. After the promulgation of Brazilian National Defense Strategy, in December 2008, the Brazilian Government appears to be interested in the Armed Forces modernization.

In 2010, during the Rio de Janeiro Security Crisis, the Brazilian Army sent 800 paratroopers to combat drug trafficking in Rio de Janeiro. Following the invasion, approximately 2,000 Army soldiers were sent to occupy the Complexo do Alemão.

In 2014, the 2,050 Army troops stormed into a Rio de Janeiro slum complex, Maré, with armoured personnel carriers and helicopters in a bid to improve security two months before the start of the 2014 FIFA World Cup. Due to the 2014 FIFA World Cup the Brazilian Army offers more than 50,000 men for security at the event, is the largest military manpower employed in the security of a FIFA World Cup.

In February 2016, the Brazilian federal government had mobilized 60% of the Armed Forces, or about 220,000 soldiers (including more than 140,000 troops of the Brazilian Army), to go "house to house" in the battle against Zika virus outbreak.

In July 2016, Brazilian Army provided more than 21,000 soldiers, 28 army helicopters and 70 armoured vehicles to ensure the security of the Rio de Janeiro city during 2016 Summer Olympics. Another 20,000 soldiers be on duty in the five cities that will co-host the Rio 2016 Olympic football tournament: Belo Horizonte, Brasília, Manaus, Salvador and São Paulo. 14,800 Army soldiers were also deployed in Rio de Janeiro during the games.

In February 2017, during the Espírito Santo violence outbreak was once again used to contain problems of urban violence that occurred after a strike by the military police of that state. Employing an effective that reached the total of 3000 soldiers.

The Brazilian Army is creating an Expeditionary Force (F EXPD) to provide permanent support for the country's participation in foreign missions.
Armed Forces officials expect the F EXPD to respond rapidly, by itself or in cooperation with security forces from partner nations, to safeguard national interests and perform a wide spectrum of operations such as humanitarian actions and peacekeeping missions. It will comply with provisions of Chapter 1 of the White Paper on National Defense, which was published in 2012 and covers the functions and actions of the country's defense forces. With the goal of deploying the force by 2022.

The Expeditionary Force (F EXPD) is initially expected to be made up of one battalion, with 1,000 soldiers, in its first year of operation in 2022. In the last phase, scheduled for 2030, it is expected to evolve into a brigade, with 3,000 troops that would add increased capacities, such as infantry, fire support, and logistics. The F EXPD will also utilize armored vehicles to increase its operational capacity and performance possibilities.

At the beginning of 2018 the Brazilian Army played a fundamental role during the Federal Intervention in the State of Rio de Janeiro, which faced a serious economic and security crisis. General Walter Souza Braga Neto, commander of the Eastern Military Command, which has its headquarters located in the city of Rio de Janeiro, took over the military and public security forces of the state in the name of the Army. He was one of those responsible for security at the 2016 Summer Olympics, based in the same city. The general assumed command of the Military Police of Rio de Janeiro State, the Civil Police of Rio de Janeiro State, and the Military Firefighters Corps and responded directly to the President of the Republic in his duty as Commander in Chief of the Armed Forces by the Constitution.

Future of the Army

The Army has a large number of active and planned projects, under the modernization plans of the Brazilian Armed Forces, defined in the National Defense White Paper.

Notable commanders and figures

Personnel

The Brazilian Army had a recorded personnel strength of 219,585 active personnel in 2014. Another estimate by the IISS in 2014 put that figure at 190,000 active personnel, with 70,000 of those being conscripts. In addition there were approximately 1,340,000 reserve personnel in 2014. This figure was down from 1,800,000 reserve personnel in 2008. In principle, the Brazilian Constitution designates the 400,000-strong Brazilian Military Police as a reserve force of the Army, although in practice they remain separate entities.

As of 2018 the size of the active component of the Brazilian Army was approximately 235,000 personnel in active service.

Conscription

According to Article 143 of the 1988 Brazilian Constitution, military service is mandatory for men, but conscientious objection is allowed. Women and clergymen are exempt from compulsory military service. At the year that they complete age eighteen, men are required to register for the draft and are expected to serve when they reach age nineteen. About 95 percent of those registering receive deferments. A growing number of recruits are volunteers, accounting for about two-thirds of the total. Those who serve generally spend one year of regular enlistment at an army garrison near their home. Some are allowed nine-month service terms but are expected to complete high school at the same time. These are called "Tiros de Guerra" or "shooting schools", which are for high school boys in medium-sized interior towns, run by army senior NCO, first sergeants or sublieutenants, and rarely a second lieutenant. In Brazilian Armed Forces, first sergeants may be promoted to the officers rank, as second lieutenant, first lieutenant and captain, becoming part of the Auxiliary Officers Corps. The army is the only service with a large number of conscripts; the navy and air force have very few.

The conscript system is primarily a means of providing basic military training to a sizable group of young men who then return to civilian life and are retained on the reserve rolls until age forty-five. The army recognizes that it provides a public service by teaching large numbers of conscripts basic skills that can be valuable to the overall economy when the young men return to civilian life.

Officer recruitment

Because the only entry into the regular officer corps is the Academia Militar das Agulhas Negras – Military Academy of the Black Needles (AMAN), its records provide an accurate picture of the officer corps. In the decades following World War II, cadets from middle-class families increased, while those from upper-class and unskilled lower-class families declined. The total number of applicants also declined as a result of economic development diversification, which gave high school graduates more attractive options than entering the military. Increasingly, AMAN cadets came from among the graduates of the army-supported Military Schools, which sons of military personnel attended tuition free. Many of these students were sons of NCOs whose own origins were not middle class, so a form of intra-institutional, upward mobility existed.

The trend in the 1960s to recruit from civilian sources has abated. The mental, health, and physical aptitude tests excluded large numbers of civilian school graduates: in 1977 of 1,145 civilians attempting the tests, only thirty-four, or 3 percent, were admitted. In 1985 only 174, or 11 percent, of the AMAN's 1,555 cadets were graduates of civilian schools; the rest were from the army's Military School system, the Cadet Preparatory School (Escola Preparatória de Cadetes—EPC), or air force or navy secondary schools. In the early 1990s, AMAN cadets were drawn exclusively from those who had completed the EPC. By the mid-1990s, the AMAN's cadet population was about 3,000.

In the twentieth century, the officer corps has been composed predominantly of men from the Southeast and South of Brazil, where military units and greater educational opportunities have been concentrated. In 1901–02 the Northeast contributed 38 percent of students at the army's preparatory school in Realengo, whereas in 1982 it provided only 13 percent to the preparatory school in Campinas. In the same years, the Southeast supplied 40.4 percent and 77 percent, while the South gave 8.6 percent and 6.3 percent. Although São Paulo, according to Alfred Stepan and other observers, has not been noted for sending its young men into the officer corps, its contribution increased from 4.3 percent of students in 1901–02 to 33.5 percent in 1982. Regional origins of cadets at the AMAN were fairly consistent in the 1964–85 period. By far the largest contingent came from the state and city of Rio de Janeiro.

Although social theorists might be pleased with indications that the army is serving as a vehicle for social mobility, army leaders are concerned. Officers have remarked on the trend toward lower-class recruitment in the Training Center for Reserve Officers (Centro de Preparação de Oficiais da Reserva—CPOR) and the problems associated with such officers. In a 1986 interview, the former minister of army, General Leônidas Pires Gonçalves, observed that he did not want officers who would give only five or ten years to the army; he wanted individuals with a military vocation, who would stay for a full thirty-plus-year career. Many officers have expressed concern that those seeking to use the army to improve their status are not sufficiently dedicated to the institution. Indeed, some officers seek the earliest possible retirement in order to get a second job (second salary) to make ends meet.

Indigenous people in the Army

The genesis of the current Army in the fight against the foreign invader, in the 17th century, counted on the decisive participation of Felipe Camarão, named by the Portuguese court as Captain-Mor among the native indigenous peoples of Brazil. Along with Francisco Barreto de Meneses, André Vidal de Negreiros, Henrique Dias and João Fernandes Vieira, he was one of the patriarchs of the Brazilian Army.

In that sense, in the early 20th century, Marshal Cândido Mariano Rondon, a descendant of the Bororó, Terena and Guará ethnic groups, served in the Army. A pioneer of the Brazilian West and Amazonian frontiers, Rondon was noted for his respect for the indigenous peoples found in his exploratory missions. He is the Patron of the Signals Corps. Today's Army counts a number of ethnic community personnel among its ranks, especially in the western borders and the tough jungles of the Amazon.

Women in the Army

Women's participation in the Army is not without precedent. In 1823, Maria Quitéria de Jesus fought alongside other soldiers for Brazilian independence; during World War II (1939-1945), 73 Brazilian nurses served in various U.S. Army hospitals; and in 1992, the Brazilian Army Leadership Academy enrolled its first class of 49 women, admitting them into that institution's Auxiliary Officer Corps.  Female service members were limited to support duties such as administration, health care, and teaching. The innovation is women's entry into combat career paths.

To begin a career with the army as officers, women must have completed a bachelor's degree in areas such as law, computer science, economics, or accounting. The competition is national in scope, and no applicant may be more than thirty-six years of age. Those accepted into the program study at the Army's School of Complementary Formation (former Army's School of Administration) in Salvador, beginning as first lieutenants (reserve). The School of Complementary Formation is also open to men. At the end of the one-year course, the graduate is promoted to first lieutenant in the permanent ranks. If starting a career in the enlisted ranks, any woman enlistee would be required to at least be a secondary school graduate.

Organization, formations and structure

Central Command
COMMANDANT OF THE ARMY (Comandante do Exército (Cmt EX))

ARMY COMMAND (Comando do Exército (CEX)) – Brasília

 Superior advisory bodies (Órgãos de Assessoramento Superior):
 Army High Command (Alto Comando do Exército (ACE))
 Superior Council for Economy and Finances (Conselho Superior de Economia e Finanças (CONSEF))
 Superior Council for Information Technology (Conselho Superior de Tecnologia da Informação (CONTIEX))
 Superior Council for Rationalization and Transformation (Conselho Superior de Racionalização e Transformação (CONSURT))
 Government-owned enterprises and organisations (Entidades Vinculadas):
 Army Housing Foundation (Fundação Habitacional do Exército (FHE))
 War Materiel Industry of Brazil (Indústria de Material Bélico do Brasil (IMBEL))
 Osorio Foundation (Fundação Osorio (Fund Osorio))
 Bodies in direct assistance to the Commandant of the Army (Órgãos de Assistência Direta e Imediata ao Comandante do Exército (OADI))
 Office of the Commandant of the Army (Gabinete do Comandante do Exército (GAB CMT Ex))
 Army Intelligence Center (Centro de Inteligência do Exército (CIE))
 Army Social Communication Center (Centro de Comunicação Social do Exército (CCOMSEx))
 Army Internal Control Center (Centro de Controle Interno do Exército (CCIEx))
 Army General Secretariat (Secretaria-Geral do Exército (SGEx))
 General directing body (Orgão de direção geral)
 Army Staff (Estado-Maior do Exército)
 Office of the Chief of Staff (Chefia)
 Office of the Vice-Chief of Staff (Vice-Chefia)
 1st Department - Personnel, Education and Culture (1ª Subchefia - Pessoal, Educação e Cultura)
 2nd Department - Information and Cyber-Defence (2ª Subchefia - Informação e Defesa Cibernética)
 3rd Department - Land Forces Doctrine (3ª Subchefia - Doutrina Militar Terrestre)
 4th Department - Logistics, Mobilization and C&T (4ª Subchefia - Logística, Mobilização e C&T)
 5th Department - Management of Special and International Relations (5ª Subchefia - Ass Especiais e Internacionais)
 6th Department - Economy and Finances (6ª Subchefia - Economia e Finanças)
 7th Department - Policy and Strategy (7ª Subchefia - Política e Estratégia)
 Special Administrative Office for Macroprojects of the Army (Assessoria Especial de Gestão e Projetos Macroprocessos do EB)
 Army Office of Projects Management (Escritório de Projetos do Exército (EPEx))
 Bodies directing sector policies (Órgãos de Direção Setorial)
 General Department of Personnel (Departamento-Geral do Pessoal (DGP))
 Department of Education and Culture of the Army (Departamento de Educação e Cultura do Exército (DECEx))
 Logistics Command (Comando Logístico (COLOG))
 Land Operations Command (Comando de Operações Terrestres (COTER))
 operational forces of the army (Força Terrestre)
 Science and Technology Department (Departamento de Ciência e Tecnologia (DCT))
 Engineering and Construction Department (Departamento de Engenharia e Construção (DEC))
 Economy and Finances Secretariat (Secretaria de Economia e Finanças (SEF))

Regional Commands

The Army is structured into eight military commands. Each of the eight military commands is responsible for one or more military regions.

  Eastern Military Command (Comando Militar do Leste; CML), (HQ: Rio de Janeiro) – 1st and 4th Military Regions
  Southeastern Military Command (Comando Militar do Sudeste; CMSE), (HQ: São Paulo) – 2nd Military Region
  Southern Military Command (Comando Militar do Sul; CMS), (HQ: Porto Alegre) – 3rd and 5th Military Regions
  Northeastern Military Command (Comando Militar do Nordeste; CMN), (HQ: Recife) – 6th, 7th and 10th Military Regions
  Western Military Command (Comando Militar do Oeste; CMO), (HQ: Campo Grande) – 9th Military Region
  Northern Military Command (Comando Militar do Norte; CMN), (HQ: Belém) – 8th Military Region
  Amazon Military Command (Comando Militar da Amazônia; CMA), (HQ: Manaus) – 12th Military Region
  Planalto Military Command (Comando Militar da Planalto; CMP), Planalto is Portuguese for high plain, (HQ: Brasília) – 11th Military Region

Military Regions 

The Brazilian territory is further divided into twelve military regions. Each military region provides logistical support to operational units within its area of responsibility. Therefore, Military Regions are usually composed of units responsible for providing administration, logistics, transport, health and education. Military Regions are Division-sized units, commanded by Lieutenant Generals (Generais de Divisão). The current military regions are:

  1st Military Region – States of Rio de Janeiro and Espírito Santo (HQ: Rio de Janeiro)
  2nd Military Region – State of São Paulo (HQ: São Paulo)
  3rd Military Region – State of Rio Grande do Sul (HQ: Porto Alegre)
  4th Military Region – State of Minas Gerais (HQ: Belo Horizonte)
  5th Military Region – States of Paraná and Santa Catarina (HQ: Curitiba)
  6th Military Region – States of Bahia and Sergipe (HQ: Salvador)
  7th Military Region – States of Rio Grande do Norte, Paraíba, Pernambuco and Alagoas (HQ: Recife)
  8th Military Region – States of Maranhão, Pará and Amapá (HQ: Belém)
  9th Military Region – States of Mato Grosso and Mato Grosso do Sul (HQ: Campo Grande)
  10th Military Region – States of Ceará and Piauí (HQ: Fortaleza)
  11th Military Region – States of Goiás, Tocantins and the Federal District (HQ: Brasília)
  12th Military Region – States of Amazonas, Acre, Roraima and Rondônia (HQ: Manaus)

Main units

Divisions
The Brazilian Army currently has six army divisions: 
 1st Army Division based in Rio de Janeiro - RJ, subordinated to the Eastern Military Command, 
 2nd Army Division based in São Paulo - SP, subordinated to the Military Command of the Southeast, 
 3rd Army Division based in Santa Maria - RS, subordinated to the Southern Military Command, 
 5th Army Division based in Curitiba - PR, subordinated to the Southern Military Command, 
 6th Army Division based in Porto Alegre - subordinated to the Southern Military Command and
 7th Army Division based in Recife - PE,  subordinated to the Northeast Military Command.

The other military forces of the Brazilian Army are subordinated directly to the area military commands, not having a commanding division. In this case, the employment of these troops is coordinated by the operations coordinating center of the area military commands.

Brigades
 1x Parachute Infantry Brigade, with:
3x Parachute Infantry Battalions
1x Parachute Cavalry Squadron
 1x Special Operations Brigade, with:
1x Special Forces Battalion, with 12 SF detachments
1x Commando Battalion
1x Psychological Operations Battalion.
 1x Light Infantry (Air Assault) (Airmobile) Brigade, with:
3x Light Infantry Airborne Battalions
1x Light Cavalry Airborne Regiment (Battalion sized).
 1x Light Infantry Brigade, with:
3x Light Infantry Battalions
1x Mechanized Cavalry (Wheeled) Regiment (Battalion size).
 1x Frontier Infantry (Wetlands Infantry) Brigade, with:
3x Frontier Infantry Battalions.
 1x Armoured Cavalry Brigade, with:
2x Tank Regiments (Battalions size)
2x Armoured Infantry Battalions
1x Mechanized Cavalry (Wheeled) Squadron
 1x Armoured Infantry Brigade, with:
2x Armoured Infantry Battalions
2x Tank Regiments (Battalions size)
1x Mechanized Cavalry (Wheeled) Squadron
 4x Mechanized Cavalry (Wheeled) Brigades, each with:
3x Mechanized Cavalry Regiments (Battalions size)
1x Armoured Cavalry Regiment (Battalion size).
 6x Jungle Infantry Brigades, each with:
3 – 4 Jungle Infantry Battalions
1x Mechanized or Jungle Cavalry Squadron
 5x Light Infantry (Motorized) Brigades, each with:
3x Motorized Infantry Battalions
1x Mechanized Cavalry Squadron
 4x Mechanized Infantry (Wheeled) Brigades, each with:
3x Mechanised Infantry Battalions
1x Mechanized Cavalry Squadron
 1x Mountain Infantry Light (Motorized) Brigades, each with:
3x Mountain Infantry Battalions
1x Mechanized Cavalry Squadron
 4x Divisional Artillery Brigades, each with:
4 – 5 Field or Rocket Artillery Battalions (Agrupements, in Brazilian Army).
 4x Construction Engineer Regiments, each one with:
3x to 5x Construction Engineer Battalions
 1x Air Defence Artillery Brigade, with:
5x Anti-aircraft Artillery Battalion
 1x Army Aviation Command(Brigade), with:
5x Army Aviation Battalions (Anti-tank, reconnaissance, multi-purpose, transport, utility).

Strategic Rapid Action Forces and Specialized Brigades

Airmobile Infantry Brigade

The 12th Aeromobile Brigade is a major elite unit of the Brazilian Army. Headquartered in Caçapava in São Paulo. Its operation area covers the whole country. It is under the 2nd Army Division / Southeastern Military Command, based in São Paulo.

It is organized, equipped and trained for rapid-response missions at any point of the country. They can move by air using business jets and civilian aircraft, but their primary means of transportation are the Brazilian Air Force's rotorcraft, from the Command Army Aviation, usually based near their barracks. By performing their main function, the airborne assault, the Airmobile Brigade constitutes an effective, permanently available instrument of strategic reach, being an integral unit of the Strategic Task Force (Força de Ação Rápida Estratégica) of the Brazilian Army.

Army Aviation Brigade

The Army Aviation Command, also known as Ricardo Kirk Brigade, is a brigade of the Brazilian Army, located in Taubaté and linked to the Land Operations Command and the Southeastern Military Command. Its historical name is a reference to Captain Ricardo Kirk, pioneer of military aviation in Brazil, killed in battle in the Contestado War.

The task of the Brazilian Army Aviation Command is to provide organic airmobility and support the ground forces by providing tactical air support, close air support and reconnaissance.

Law and Order Operations Brigade

The 11th Infantry Brigade is one of the brigades operating in the Brazilian Army. Its headquarters is located in Campinas, São Paulo.

This infantry brigade is specialized in operations in urban terrain, being able to act in cases of severe instability or danger to public order. The brigade is used in Brazil often in actions against organized crime and drug trafficking, especially in large urban centers.

It also has a Law Enforcement Operations Instruction Center and the Order is a School Subunit. Peculiar Employment Unit of the Brazilian Army in Law Enforcement and Order Operations and Military Operations in Urban Environments.

It is trained to operate both in case of riots and in the fight against organized crime and drug trafficking, when the local law enforcement agencies are unable to do so by themselves. Recently it has operated alongside other elite Army forces in the pacification of communities that were previously under control of drug traffickers in Rio de Janeiro.

Jungle Warfare Brigades

The Jungle Warfare Training Centre – Centro de Instrução de Guerra na Selva (CIGS), also known as the Colonel Jorge Teixeira Centre, is a military organisation based in Manaus, intended to qualify military leaders of small groups, as wilderness warriors, fighters able to accomplish military nature missions in the most inhospitable areas of the Brazilian rainforest.

Courses are taught in jungle operations scenery in different categories – Senior Officers, Officers, Senior Non-Commissioned Officers, Non-Commissioned Officers, Medical and Health Care Personnel, and small courses for the military, police forces and civilians. Its symbol is the jaguar.
The Jungle Warfare Training Center (CIGS) is structured as Department of Education, a Department of Doctrine and Research, a Student Division, a Department of Veterinary Medicine, a Department of Administration and a Support Company.

Although officers and NCOs from all over Brazil can apply to take courses at CIGS, most of the troopers that support training are locals, natives from the area that are mainly privates and corporals. Because they are adapted to the conditions of the life inside the forest, they are more capable of performing a vast array of activities, such as hunting, hiding and moving through the forest with ease. Many foreigners and Brazilian military personnel that underwent training at CIGS have described the impressive abilities shown by these soldiers during operations. Their experience and skills in jungle survival certainly help shaping the Brazilian Jungle Warfare Brigades into deadliest units of its kind in the world.

The Brigades also have experience in combat. Engaged in protecting the northern borders of Brazil, the troops are constantly exposed to attacks from border countries' guerrillas, drug dealers, and criminals of all kinds. The Brazilian Army commonly acts along with other law enforcement organisations in order to fight not only the drugs trafficking, but also animals, weapons, people and several other illegal deeds.

Paratroopers Brigade

The Paratroopers Brigade is a major elite unit of the Brazilian Army. Its headquarters is located in Vila Militar, in the city of Rio de Janeiro. Subordinate to the Eastern Military Command, based in Rio de Janeiro, in conjunction with the Land Operations Command, based in Brasilia.

The brigade is one of the elite forces of the Brazilian Army prepared to act on within 48 hours anywhere in the country, is in the jungle, savanna, marsh and mountain, and remain without logistical support for up to 72 hours, being able to parachute jump quickly to the frontlines or behind enemy lines. After completion of the mission, handing territory to another conventional unit to maintain the position gained, according to the doctrine of the Brazilian Army training, usually a unit or a brigade of armoured Infantry will be responsible for replacing the Paratrooper Brigade field after the transfer of the territory to another unit of the Ground Force. The Paratrooper Brigade is then thrown back behind enemy lines once more to make way for the Allied troops.

The Brigade is a fundamental part of the Strategic Task Force (Força de Ação Rápida Estratégica), by being able to quickly operate in any part of the national territory in case of war or invasion.

Due to the deadly and dangerous nature of this brigade's missions, the Brazilian paratroopers have a unique ethos. For instance, while regular infantry troops use black boots and green berets, the paratroopers use brown boots and red berets. They consider themselves superior to the "Pé pretos" (black foots), which are the regular infantrymen. The Brazilian Army's motto, "Brasil acima de tudo!" (Brazil, above everything else) was originally the paratroopers' war cry before it was popularized (nowadays, it's a common greeting between the military to say this motto). The paratroopers are very proud of themselves, and they always stand out when they are among other troops.

Special Operations Brigade

The Special Operations Brigade is Brazil's special operations force. Although administratively assigned to the Plateau Military Command, the brigade's operations are under the direct control of the Land Operations Command.
The Special Forces were initially formed in 1957 as a parachute trained rescue unit, which specialized in conducting deep jungle rescues along the Amazon basin. After conducting its initial selection, a US Army Special Forces Mobile Training Team (MTT) conducted the unit's first training course.

Nowadays, it is specialized in non conventional warfare, performing psychological operations and harassing bigger enemy units, such as Brigades and Divisions. Acting in smalls cells and detachments (usually no more than 20 men), the Special Forces act deep behind enemy lines, and are capable of fighting in extremely unfavorable situations.

For its creation, the Army Command issued decrees organizing the core of the Brigade (Nu Bda Op Esp), reporting initially to the Brigade Parachute Infantry. Most of its subordinate organizations were stationed in the area of Camboatá (West Zone of Rio de Janeiro), where he was the 1st BFEsp, whose commander served, cumulatively, in the initial phase, the command of Nu Bda Op Esp and management of project deployment.

Its motto is "any mission, in any place, at any time, by every way". Related Commandos troops, a battalion the size of Special Operations Brigade, has an analogous motto: "The maximum confusion, death and destruction in the deep rear of the enemy".

It is also capable of performing other types of missions, such as counter-terrorism, strategic scouting, finding and attacking high-value targets and stealing, extracting and evading. Due to the extremely high level of danger of those missions, this unit is composed of only a few members, who must have completed the Commandos and Paraquedista (Commandos and Paratroopers). They are highly specialized and ready to operate anywhere in the world in less than 45 hours. Because of this, they are recognized as one of the most prestigious units in the Brazilian Army.

The unit's baptism of fire took place in the 1970s during operations against the force of the Araguaia Guerrilla, when the hitherto Detachment Special Forces, with their effective command and special forces, was the only unit that fought almost uninterruptedly throughout the campaign, whether in combat actions, or espionage, without the engagement of the controls and special forces of the army, the defeat of the guerrillas would have been more difficult, since such military are experts in counter-guerrilla of the Brazilian Army.

In 1991, guerrillas of the Revolutionary Armed Forces of Colombia, entered the Brazilian territory and attacked a small Brazilian Army border contingent, the response was immediate, and the then Special Forces Battalion held in conjunction with other units, retaliation operation, Operation Traira, and the result was 12 dead guerrillas, captured numerous, most of the weapons and equipment recovered.

Recently under the aegis of the United Nations, the Special Operations Brigade played a decisive role in combating the paramilitary groups that plagued the Haitian territory and caused great political instability in the country, and the 1st Special Forces Battalion, 1st Command Action Battalion and the 1st Psychological operations Battalion the only army units that send military in all contingent to MINUSTAH since the beginning of the mission, and special operations performed by these units were fundamental to the pacification of Port-au-Prince.

Mountain Operations Brigade

It's a specialized infantry brigade of the Brazilian Army. Its headquarters is located in Juiz de Fora, Minas Gerais. Its catchment area covers the state of Minas Gerais and Petropolis. It is administered by the 1st Army Division / Eastern Military Command, headquartered in Rio de Janeiro.

4th Mountain Infantry Brigade, a unit of the Brazilian Army specializing in mountain combat operation, improving and developing special techniques of mountain operations, and using equipment and weapons specific to this theater of operations, has established itself over the years as an elite troop, even multiplying their special techniques to other Brazilian military units, which will attend their courses and internships, assisting the training of the members of the Strategic Task Force (Força de Ação Rápida Estratégica) of the Brazilian Army.

During World War II, the Brazilian infantry had a major highlight in the conquest of the town of Montese situated in mountainous terrain and heavily defended by the Germans as the last bastion to stop the advancing allied troops toward the Po Valley. On April 14, 1945, the massive Montese became the scene of the most arduous and bloody battle of Brazilian arms in Italy, in the words of their own Commander Brazilian Expeditionary Force Marechal Mascarenhas de Morais. Having led the main effort of the attack as fighting in dense minefields and under heavy fire from German machine guns, they were finally able to conquer Montese.

Fast Motorized Operations Brigade 

The 3rd Mechanized Infantry Brigade, also known as the Viscount of Porto Seguro's Own Brigade, is one of the Brigades of the Brazilian Army. Its headquarters is located in Crystal, in Goiás State. It is subject to the Planalto Military Command, with headquarters in Brasilia. Its subordinate military organizations are located in the Federal District and the states of Goiás, Tocantins and Minas Gerais region known as Triangulo Mineiro. Its historic name is a tribute to the Viscount of Porto Seguro, Francisco Adolfo Varnhagem.

The 3rd Brigade is part of the strategic reserve of the Brazilian Army, but should be able to be employed at any time and in any part of Brazil. Being a mechanized formation, it can be deployed fast enough anywhere nationwide either for conventional operations or to reinforce the military police in keeping public order, and can still perform promptly any motorized, airmobile or airborne action.

Specialized Battalions, Regiments and Commands

1st Chemical, Biological, Radiological and Nuclear Defense Battalion

The 1st Chemical, Biological, Radiological and Nuclear Defesne Battalion, raised in 2012 by the redesignation of the Army CBRN Defense Company, is the only one of its kind in the Brazilian Army, and its members are trained for combat in chemical, biological and nuclear warfare (as the name suggests), mainly in control and decontamination of weapons, local and military equipment.

The battalion's origin dates back to 1953, when the Chemical Warfare Company, originally subject to the Reverse Split Units-School (RSUS) was set up on the premises of the Special Education School (SES)

On December 31, 1987, the Chemical Warfare School was extinguished and, in its place, the CBRN Company was created, based in the city of Rio de Janeiro and subordinated to the Board of Specialization and Extension.

17th Border Battalion (Swamp Operations )

The 17th BB is an elite unit of the Brazilian Army, specializing in swamp operations that is located in the city of Corumbá, state of Mato Grosso do Sul.

Its main missions, ensuring the western border of Brazil, the development and improvement of technical and operational doctrines and special combat specific swampy environment (present in many places in the world) and also multiply its technical operations in wetland units members Strategic Task Force (Força de Ação Rápida Estratégica)of the Brazilian Army, but specifically, offering a course of Wetland Operations (Operações no Pantanal) to the Special Operations Brigade, Parachute Infantry Brigade and the 12th Light Infantry Brigade (airborne), units within the Strategic Task Force, and also military from other regions, particularly the Western Military Command, which is responsible for the protection of the western border of the Brazilian territory.
Besides that, there are also exchanges of techniques and experiences with the Brazilian Marines, which also apply to the Wetland Operations course and are remarkably skilled in amphibious operations.

72nd Motorized Infantry Battalion (Caatinga/Savanna Operations)

The 72nd MIB is an elite unit of the Brazilian Army based in Petrolina, being the only unit of the Brazilian Army to train the warfighter to the operating environment of Caatinga and Savanna. The Caatinga Operations Instructions Center, covering an area of approximately 28,000 km2, is within the territory of the battalion.

The facilities of the Caatinga Operations Instructions Center are comprised in an area which belongs to the Ministry of Defence, named the Field Instruction Iron Tank Farm, responsible for the formation of the Caatinga battle combatant in this environment. The vegetation is aggressive and thorny, the sun is very harsh for most of the daytime and water is sparse. The conditions of this area are very difficult to withstand and soldiers who finish this course are acknowledged as Caatinga Warriors of the Brazilian Army, as described by the Brazilian Army in its website (in Portuguese).

Amazon Military Command Boat Center 

The Center for Ships of the Military Command of the Amazon is a unique unit within the Brazilian Army, but that very well represents the peculiarities existing in the military organization of the Military Command of the Amazon. Coming from the 1st Special Transport Company, created on October 1, 1969, the  Vessel Center is responsible for tactical and logistical river transport within the scope of the 12th Military Region, a mission that has a constant in overcoming them more varied challenges. In addition to being operational.

The inexistence of cartographic references, lack of signaling of critical points, the regime of the rivers, the isolation, the difficulties in communications, the differentiated maintenance of the means used and the primordial need to have specialized and qualified personnel to safely guide the employed boats, these are just a few examples of the obstacles faced in this peculiar type of transport. In order to meet not only the needs, but also those of the other military organization that have vessels, the Command Boat Center minister under the supervision of the DEE, the River Navigation Course, which lasts 16 weeks, is intended for the training of future vessel commanders.

The Amazon Military Command Vessel Center consists of the Command, 3 Company and 1 Teaching Division.

Presidential Guard

The Presidential Guard Battalion is a unit of the Brazilian Army and honor guard to the President of Brazil. Two other units, the 1st Guards Cavalry Regiment and the Cayenne Battery, are also part of the presidential honor guard unit, and they all report to Army HQ.

The PGB had its origins in the Emperor's Battalion, organized in 1823 during the peace campaigns that followed the Declaration of Independence as the guards unit for the Imperial Family of Brazil, and as such wears its 19th-century uniforms. Disbanded in 1827, it was reformed in 1933.

The 1st Guards Cavalry Regiment, also known as the "Dragões da Independência" (Independence Dragoons), is the squadron-sized horse guards regiment of the Army. The name was given in 1927 and refers to the fact that a detachment of dragoons escorted the Prince Royal of Portugal, Pedro VI, at the time when he declared Brazilian independence from Portugal, on September 7, 1822. The Independence Dragoons wear 19th century uniforms similar to those of the earlier Imperial Honor Guard, which are used as the regimental full dress uniform since 1927. The uniform was designed by Debret, in white and red, with plumed bronze helmets. The colors and pattern were influenced by the Austrian dragoons of the period, as the Brazilian Empress Consort was also an Austrian Archduchess.  The color of the plumes varies according to rank. The Independence Dragoons are armed with lances and sabres, the latter only for the officers and the colour guard.

The regiment was established in 1808 by the Prince Regent and future king of Portugal, John VI, with the duty of protecting the Portuguese royal family, which had sought refuge in Brazil during the Napoleonic wars. However, dragoons had existed in Portugal since at least the early 18th century, and in 1719, units of this type of cavalry were sent to Brazil, initially to escort shipments of gold and diamonds and to guard the Viceroy who resided in Rio de Janeiro (1st Cavalry Regiment – Vice-Roy's Horse Guard Squadron). Later, they were also sent to the south to serve against the Spanish during frontier clashes. After the proclamation of Brazilian independence, the title of the regiment was changed to that of the Imperial Honor Guard, with the role of protecting the Imperial Family. The guard was later disbanded by Emperor Pedro II and would be recreated only later in the republican era, this time as the horse guards unit mandated to defend and protect the President of Brazil and his First Family, the Vice President of Brazil and all offices of the national government. At the time of the Republic proclamation in 1889, horse #6 of the Imperial Honor Guard was ridden by the officer making the declaration, Second Lieutenant Eduardo José Barbosa, with the permission of Field Marshal Deodoro da Fonseca. This is commemorated by the custom under which the horse having this number is used only by the commander of the modern regiment, usually a superior officer with the rank of a lieutenant colonel.

The regiment maintains its own band, which also serves as the official presidential band.

Army Police Battalions and Platoons

The Army Police Branch is composed of specialized units of the Brazilian Army Infantry, who develop and perform the mission of military police along the headquarters of major commands and major units of Land Force garrisons.

As operating units of the Army Police, there are several battalions, companies, and platoons, including riot control, K-9, motorcyclists, and regular troops. Military Police of the Brazilian Army are identified by the use of black armband with the letters "PE" in white (or white armband with red letters).

Commonly, the term "Military Police" is used to refer to the State Military Police Forces.

Current Equipment

 Main battle tanks – 469 M60A3 TTS, Leopard 1A1 and Leopard 1A5/GR)
 Armored vehicles – 1,976 (Iveco LMV 4x4, AV-VBL 4x4, Cascavel 6x6, Urutu 6x6, Guarani 6x6, M113, M577 and Armoured recovery vehicle) 
 Artillery pieces – 1,149 (120mm mortar, ASTROS, M101, M114, 105mm Mod 56, L118, Oerlikon 35mm and Bofors 40 mm)
 Self-propelled artillery – 212 M109, M992 and Gepard)
 Surface-to-air missile system – 239 (9K38 Igla and RBS 70)
 River Boats - 74 (LPR-40, Guardian 25, MRCD 1200/1250, DGS ETRH, DGS 999 Raptor, Ferryboats, Tugboats and Catamarans)
 Other military vehicles – ~20,000 (Agrale Marruá, Toyota Hilux, Mitsubishi Pajero, Land Rover Defender, Toyota Land Cruiser, Ford F, Worker, Atego, Constellation, Unimog, Tatra 815, motorcycles, buses and others)

In addition the Brazilian Army Aviation Command operates 94 helicopters and UAVs.

Transport helicopters – EC 725 Caracal
Attack and Observation helicopters – HB350 Esquilo, AS550 Fennec and AS565 Panther
Multi-mission and rescue helicopters – AS532 Cougar and Sikorsky S-70A
Tatical unmanned aircraft system - Nauru 1000c

Current Equipment of the Brazilian Army

Ranks, uniforms, and insignia

The senior-most commissioned rank in the Brazilian Army is the "General de Exército", a "four-star" general. In times of war, or in exceptional circumstances, a fifth star may be worn by the highest-ranking officer in the army, who is then promoted to "Marechal",. Brazilian Army officers wear rank insignia on shoulder boards and the army has ten officer ranks, also known as "grades", excluding that of an officer candidate.

Brazilian Army officer ranks from second lieutenant to colonel equate directly with counterparts in the United States Army, but thereafter the systems diverge. A Brazilian "General de Brigada" wears two stars, with duties equivalent to a U.S. Army major general, the next higher rank, "General de Divisão", equivalent to an American lieutenant general, wears three; their United States counterparts have only two and three stars, respectively. The next higher rank, designated by four stars, is "General de Exército".  The Marshal wears five stars, but that rank is rarely attained on active duty. This rank is corresponds to an American general of the army. The last Marshal of Brazilian Army was Waldemar Levy Cardoso, that died in 2009, with 108 years old.

Brazil's army has strict up-or-out retirement rules, which were developed in the mid-1960s by President Castelo Branco. The internal command structure determines all promotions through the rank of colonel. The president is involved in the promotions to general and chooses one candidate from a list of three names presented to him by the High Command. Once passed over at the Presidential Promotion Board, the non-promotable colonel must retire. All colonels must retire at age fifty-nine and all four-star generals must retire at age sixty-six, or after twelve years as general.
Despite the up-or-out system, under President José Sarney the army became top-heavy as generals began to occupy many positions that previously had been reserved for colonels. In 1991 there were fifteen four-stars, forty three-stars, and 110 two-stars generals. The figure for four-stars generals did not include four who were Ministers in the Superior Military Court (Superior Tribunal Militar—STM). Thus, in the mid-1990s the army sought to reduce the number of active-duty generals. In 2014, there are fifteen four-stars, forty five three-stars, and eighty nine two-stars generals in active service.

The highest Brazilian Army enlisted rank is "Sub Tenente", which is the equivalent of an American command sergeant major and sergeant major ranks. The other NCOs are Primeiro Sargento equivalent of an American first sergeant or master sergeant, "Segundo Sargento" equivalent to a sergeant first class and staff sergeant, Terceiro Sargento equivalent to sergeant. Then there is the Cabo corporal with the same duties as a sergeant in a regular Army Infantry Platoon, acting as the Squad Leader. The Brazilian Army has no corresponding equivalent to the U.S. Army's specialist rank. The "Soldado" is equivalent to a private first class or to a private depending on the length of service time.

Historical Equipment

Tanks
Renault FT: 12 units 1921–1942
L3/35: 24 units 1938–1945
M3 Stuart A3/A5: 437 units 1942–1978
M3 Lee: 104 units 1942–1969
M4 Sherman A1: 85 units 1944–1972
X1 Pioneiro: 53 units 1976-1994
X1A1/A2 Carcará: 25 units 1977-1995
M41 B/C: 368 units 1960–2010 ** (+50 units in storage by 2022)
EE-T1 Osório: 2 prototypes 1982–2004
Bernardini MB-3 Tamoyo: 3 prototypes

Armoured vehicle
Citroën P17: 10 units 1935–1950
Sd.Kfz.6,7,8: 11 units 1939–1960
M4 Tractor: 64 units 1941–1980
M8 Greyhound: 20 units 1944–1976
M20 Armoured Car: 2 units 1945–1985
M3 Scout Car A1: 100 units 1942–1979
M2 Half Track Car: 437 units 1943–1980
M3 Half-track: 49 units 1944–1976
M5 half-track: 20 units 1945-1977
M59 APC: 500 units 1960–1982
EE-3 Jararaca: 2 units 1979-1990
EE-T4 Ogum: 1985-1989
EE-11 Urutu: 400 units 1975-2022** (140 units in storage by 2022)

Artillery
Canet guns 100mm: ? 1880–1911
Hotchkiss gun: ? 1887–1936
Bofors 75 mm Model 1934: 120 units 1935–1960
Krupp 7.5 cm Model 1903: 332 units 1908–1984
7.5 cm FK 38: 80 units 1939–1970
8.8 cm Flak 18/36/37/41: 28 units 1941-1954
BL 6-inch Gun Mk XIX: 116 units 1942–1977
M116 howitzer: 36 units 1942–1990
M3 Gun Motor Carriage: 10 units 1943–1970
Ordnance QF 6-pounder: 122 units 1942-2000
Ordnance QF 25-pounder: ? 1943–1970
Bethlehem 177: 11 units 1945–1968
90 mm Gun M1/M2/M3: ? 1944–1977
37 mm gun M3: 148 units 1942-1989
M102 howitzer: 19 units 1961-1990
M40 recoilless rifle: 210 units 1965-2017
Roland SAM: 04 units 1970–1999
M108 howitzer: 72 units 1970-2019 ** (11 units in storage by 2022)

Historical Vehicles
Dodge WC: 4,000 units 1940–1985
GMC CCKW: 2,600 units 1940–1970
Studebaker US6 2½-ton 6x6 truck: 808 units 1942-1969
Willys MB: 1,300 units 1946–2000
Dodge M37: 332 units 1960–1993
EE-34: 300 units 1973–2002
M151 ¼-ton 4×4 utility truck: 65 units 1965-2009

See also
 Brazilian Navy
 Brazilian Air Force
 Escola de Comando e Estado-Maior do Exército
 Academia Militar das Agulhas Negras
 Escola Preparatória de Cadetes do Exército
 List of Commanders of the Escola de Comando e Estado-Maior do Exército
 List of Commanders of the Academia Militar das Agulhas Negras
 Brazilian cavalry
 Brazilian Army Aviation
 Armed Forces of the Empire of Brazil

Units
 Presidential Guard Battalion
 1st Guards Cavalry Regiment
 Cayenne Battery
 1º Batalhão de Forcas Especiais
 Mountain Infantry Battalion
Generic
Military history of Brazil
Rebellions and revolutions in Brazil
List of wars involving Brazil

References

Bibliography
Celso Castro, Vitor Izecksohn and Hendrik Kraay "Nova História Militar Brasileira" (New Brazilian Military History)  Getúlio Vargas Foundation 2004 
Christiane Figueiredo Pagano de Mello "Forças Militares no Brasil Colonial" (Military Forces in Colonial Brazil)  E-papers 2009 
Dávila, Jerry. "Hotel Tropico: Brazil and the challenge of African Decolonization, 1950–1980." Duke University Press 2010 
Dudley, William Sheldon "Reform and Radicalism in the Brazilian Army, 1870–1889" Columbia University 1972
Donato, Hernâni "Dicionário das Batalhas Brasileiras" (Dictionary of Brazilian Battles)  IBRASA 1996 (2nd edition ) 
Faoro, Raymundo "Os Donos do Poder" (Owners of Power)  Globo 2012 (1st edition 1957) 
Fishel, John T. & Sáenz, Andrés "Capacity Building for Peacekeeping; The case of Haiti" NDU Press & Potomac Books 2007 
Gaspari, Elio – A widely documented series containing 5 volumes (divided into 3 parts: "The Armed illusions" Volumes I-II, "The Priest and Warlock" volumes III-IV, and "The End" volume V), about Brazilian Army and the last military dictatorship in Brazil:
Volume I "A Ditadura Envergonhada" (The Dictatorship Embarrassed)  
Volume II "A Ditadura Escancarada" (The Dictatorship Revealed)  
Volume III "A Ditadura Derrotada" (The Dictatorship Defeated)   and
Volume IV "A Ditadura Encurralada" (The Dictatorship Trapped)  . 
Volume V "A Ditadura Acabada" (The Dictatorship Finished)   All books by Companhia das Letras, 2002–2004 (Volumes I to IV) and 2016 (Volume V).
Guerra, Cláudio "Memórias de uma Guerra Suja" (Memoirs of a Dirty War)  TopBooks 2012 
Hooker, Terry "The Paraguayan War: Armies of the Nineteenth Century; The Americas" Foundry 2008
Joes, Anthony James "Urban Guerrilla Warfare" University Press of Kentucky 2007 on Google Books
Kenkel, Kai Michael. "South America and Peace Operations: Coming of Age" Routledge, 2013. 
Kraay, Hendrik "Race, State and Armed Forces in Independence-Era Brazil" Stanford University Press 2001 
Kraay, Hendrick &  Whigham, Thomas "I Die with My Country: Perspectives on the Paraguayan War, 1864–1870" University of Nebraska, 2004 
Lochery, Neill. "Brazil: The Fortunes of War, War II and the Making of Modern Brazil" Basic Books, 2014 
López, Adriana "Franceses e Tupinambás na Terra do Brasil" (French and Indigenous in land of Brazil)  SENAC 2001 
McCann, Frank D. "Soldiers of the Patria, A History of the Brazilian Army, 1889–1937" Stanford University Press 2004 
Mello, Evaldo Cabral de "Olinda restaurada; Guerra e Açúcar no Nordeste, 1630–1654" (Olinda restored: War and Sugar in Northeast Brazil, 1630–1654)  Editora 34 Ltda 2007 (1st edition 1975)
Salles, Ricardo. "Guerra do Paraguai: memórias & imagens" (Paraguayan War: Memories and Images)  Edições Biblioteca Nacional, 2003 
Smallman, Shawn C. "Fear & Memory: in the Brazilian Army & Society, 1889–1954" University of North Carolina Press 2002 
Teixeira, Carlos Gustavo Poggio. "Brazil, the United States, and the South American Subsystem: Regional Politics and the Absent Empire" Lexington Books, 2012 
Skidmore, Thomas E.:
"Politics in Brazil 1930–1964: An Experiment in Democracy" Oxford University Press 1967
"The Politics of Military Rule in Brazil: 1964–85" Oxford University Press 1988

External links
 Official Brazilian Army Website (in Portuguese)
 Official Brazilian Army Aviation Command Website (in Portuguese)
 Base Militar Web Magazine (in Portuguese)
 Information on the Osório MBT (in English)
 Military Orders and Medals from Brazil (in Portuguese)
 Uniforms Brazilian Army 1822–1830 (in Russian)
 Latin American Light Weapons National Inventories  (in English)

 
Armies by country
Military units and formations established in 1822
1822 establishments in Brazil